Robert II (died 1134 or 1137) was the son and successor of Count Robert I of Loritello. His father died in 1107. He married his second cousin Adelaide, a daughter of Roger II of Sicily and Elvira of Castile. They had a son, named William, who succeeded him.

Robert was a friend of the Church. He took part in the council of Troia (1115) of Pope Paschal II and that of 1120 of Callixtus II.

Sources
Lexikon des Mittelalters.
Molise in the Norman period.

1130s deaths
Italo-Normans
Robert 2
Year of birth unknown